The Pontificia Universidad Católica Madre y Maestra (Mother and Teacher Pontifical Catholic University), named after Pope John XXIII's encyclical Mater et magistra, which means Mother and Teacher, (PUCMM for its Spanish acronym), is the first private, Roman Catholic, coeducational university in the Dominican Republic (excluding colonial times). The university grants undergraduate, graduate, doctoral, and professional degrees through three campuses. Its main campus is in the city of Santiago de los Caballeros, and it has a smaller campus in Santo Domingo and an extension in Puerto Plata.

History

The university was established on September 9, 1962 and it has become one of the country's top institutions of higher education. It was the first University to offer Industrial, Electrical, Mechanical and Electronics Engineering careers. It also offers graduate level degrees and dual degrees with associated universities in the United States and France. According to the school, it was founded by the Dominican Episcopate headed by Monsignor Octavio Antonio Beras Rojas, Archbishop of the city of Santo Domingo. Its name "Madre y Maestra" was selected in honor of the encyclical of Pope John XXIII of the same name (in Latin Mater et Magistra). Its first faculties were Law, Education, and Philosophy. It was recognized by the Dominican government by law 6150 from December 31, 1962.

Rankings
PUCMM has been listed consistently as the second-best university in the Dominican Republic, after UNIBE, by QS Latin America University Rankings, while the Webometrics Ranking of World Universities ranks it number one in the Dominican Republic. Recently Quacquarelli Symonds's top Latin American universities in 2012 recognized the university, ranking 205 out of the top 250 universities in the region. The PUCMM School of Business also is the highest-ranking school of business in the Dominican Republic, followed by the School of Business of the UASD. This ranking was done by Eduniversal Rankings and their prestigious Palmes business school ranking. The PUCMM received the 2 Palmes ranking which represents a Good business school with regional influence. In 1991, the institution was delegated as the responsible for country domain registration, that is .do domains.

Divisions
 School of Social and Administrative Sciences: Business Administration, Hotel Management, Financial Management and Auditing, Marketing, Psychology, Economics, Ecology and Environmental Management.
 School of Engineering: Industrial Engineering, Systems and Computer Engineering, Telematics Engineering, Civil Engineering, Electromechanical Engineering, Electronic Engineering.
 School of Sciences and Humanities: Architecture, Interior Design, Law, Social Communication,  Basic Education, Secondary Education, Psychology, Philosophy.
 School of Health Sciences: Physical Therapy, Medicine, Stomatology, Nursing.

See also
 Mater et magistra

References

External links
Official website

Pontificia Universidad Católica Madre y Maestra
Roman Catholic universities and colleges in the Caribbean
Pontifical universities
Santiago de los Caballeros
Educational institutions established in 1962
Education in Santo Domingo
1962 establishments in North America